The Kittitian and Nevisian ambassador in Washington, D. C. is the official representative of the Government in Basseterre to the Government of the United States.

List of representatives

References 

 
United States
Saint Kitts and Nevis